Antennaria argentea is a North American species of flowering plants in the family Asteraceae known by the common name silver pussytoes or silvery everlasting. It is native primarily to Oregon and to northern and central California with additional populations in Nevada, Idaho, Montana, and Washington.

Antennaria argentea grows in dry coniferous forests. This is a perennial herb forming a basal patch of woolly grayish oval-shaped leaves a few centimeters long and many slender erect stems up to 40 centimeters tall. It is dioecious, with male and female plants producing different types of flowers. Both flower types are clustered in many flower heads with whitish phyllaries. The female plants produce fruits which are achenes with a soft pappus a few millimeters long.

References

External links
Paul Slichter, Pussytoes: The Genus Antennaria West of the Cascade Mountains of Oregon and Washington, Silvery Pussytoes, Silvery Everlasing Antennaria argentea several photos
Jepson Manual Treatment
United States Department of Agriculture Plants Profile
Calphotos Photo gallery, University of California

argentea
Flora of the Western United States
Plants described in 1849